The arrondissement of Strasbourg-Campagne is a former arrondissement of France in the Bas-Rhin department in the Alsace region. It was disbanded at the 2015 arrondissements reform, and its communes were assigned to the arrondissements of Saverne, Strasbourg, Haguenau-Wissembourg and Molsheim. It had 104 communes, and its population was 284,815 (2012).

Composition

The 104 communes of the arrondissement of Strasbourg-Campagne, and their INSEE codes, were:

 Achenheim (67001)
 Alteckendorf (67005)
 Bernolsheim (67033)
 Berstett (67034)
 Bietlenheim (67038)
 Bilwisheim (67039)
 Bischheim (67043)
 Blaesheim (67049)
 Bossendorf (67058)
 Breuschwickersheim (67065)
 Brumath (67067)
 Dingsheim (67097)
 Donnenheim (67100)
 Dossenheim-Kochersberg (67102)
 Duntzenheim (67107)
 Duppigheim (67108)
 Durningen (67109)
 Eckbolsheim (67118)
 Eckwersheim (67119)
 Entzheim (67124)
 Eschau (67131)
 Ettendorf (67135)
 Fegersheim (67137)
 Fessenheim-le-Bas (67138)
 Friedolsheim (67145)
 Furdenheim (67150)
 Gambsheim (67151)
 Geispolsheim (67152)
 Geiswiller (67153)
 Geudertheim (67156)
 Gingsheim (67158)
 Gougenheim (67163)
 Grassendorf (67166)
 Gries (67169)
 Griesheim-sur-Souffel (67173)
 Handschuheim (67181)
 Hangenbieten (67182)
 Hochfelden (67202)
 Hoenheim (67204)
 Hœrdt (67205)
 Hohatzenheim (67207)
 Hohfrankenheim (67209)
 Holtzheim (67212)
 Hurtigheim (67214)
 Illkirch-Graffenstaden (67218)
 Ingenheim (67220)
 Issenhausen (67225)
 Ittenheim (67226)
 Kienheim (67236)
 Kilstett (67237)
 Kolbsheim (67247)
 Krautwiller (67249)
 Kriegsheim (67250)
 Kurtzenhouse (67252)
 Kuttolsheim (67253)
 La Wantzenau (67519)
 Lampertheim (67256)
 Lingolsheim (67267)
 Lipsheim (67268)
 Lixhausen (67270)
 Melsheim (67287)
 Minversheim (67293)
 Mittelhausbergen (67296)
 Mittelhausen (67297)
 Mittelschaeffolsheim (67298)
 Mommenheim (67301)
 Mundolsheim (67309)
 Mutzenhouse (67312)
 Neugartheim-Ittlenheim (67228)
 Niederhausbergen (67326)
 Oberhausbergen (67343)
 Oberschaeffolsheim (67350)
 Olwisheim (67361)
 Osthoffen (67363)
 Ostwald (67365)
 Pfettisheim (67374)
 Pfulgriesheim (67375)
 Plobsheim (67378)
 Quatzenheim (67382)
 Reichstett (67389)
 Ringeldorf (67402)
 Ringendorf (67403)
 Rohr (67406)
 Rottelsheim (67417)
 Saessolsheim (67423)
 Schaffhouse-sur-Zorn (67439)
 Scherlenheim (67444)
 Schiltigheim (67447)
 Schnersheim (67452)
 Schwindratzheim (67460)
 Souffelweyersheim (67471)
 Stutzheim-Offenheim (67485)
 Truchtersheim (67495)
 Vendenheim (67506)
 Waltenheim-sur-Zorn (67516)
 Weyersheim (67529)
 Wickersheim-Wilshausen (67530)
 Willgottheim (67532)
 Wilwisheim (67534)
 Wingersheim (67539)
 Wintzenheim-Kochersberg (67542)
 Wiwersheim (67548)
 Wolfisheim (67551)
 Zœbersdorf (67560)

History

The arrondissement of Strasbourg-Campagne was created in 1919. It was disbanded in 2015. The cantons of the arrondissement of Strasbourg-Campagne were, as of January 2015:
 Bischheim
 Brumath
 Geispolsheim
 Hochfelden
 Illkirch-Graffenstaden
 Mundolsheim
 Schiltigheim
 Truchtersheim

References

Strasbourg-Campagne